Operation Nanook (OP NANOOK) is an annual sovereignty operation and manoeuvre warfare exercise conducted by the Canadian Armed Forces in the Arctic. Sovereignty patrols in the Canadian Arctic Archipelago and northern Canada are conducted by the Canadian Rangers, Canadian Coast Guard in tandem with the Royal Canadian Mounted Police. The exercise portion is intended to train the different elements of the Canadian Armed Forces (Canadian Army, Royal Canadian Air Force and Royal Canadian Navy) to operate in the Arctic environment.

The following is a list of annual exercises that comprise Operation Nanook:

2007 
Operation Nanook 2007 was the 2007 joint exercise of Maritime Command and the Canadian Coast Guard to train for disaster and sovereignty patrols in the Arctic. Similar exercises have been conducted every year since.

Elements of the Canadian Coast Guard and the Royal Canadian Mounted Police joined with elements of the Canadian Forces in the exercise.

During the exercise Summerside played a drug smuggling vessel, nicknamed MV Rusty Bucket.

2008 
Operation Nanook 2008 was a joint exercise of Maritime Command and the Canadian Coast Guard, held in August 2008. Canada conducted a similar joint exercise, also named Operation Nanook, in 2007.

The exercise was held from 11 to 25 August 2008. Two Canadian warships and two air force planes, a CC-138 Twin Otter and a CP-140 Aurora, took part in the exercises in Canada's Arctic. The frigate , the minesweeper  and the Canadian Coast Guard icebreaker  travelled along the Hudson Strait. The operation extended to Davis Strait and Frobisher Bay.

There have been 18 such humanitarian operations since 2002. As more Arctic ice melts, the ships sail through uncharted waters. Emergency response times were tested for such potential disasters as oil spills, or rescue operations such as responding to cruise ship emergencies.

General Walter J. Natynczyk, Canada's chief of Defence staff,  Peter MacKay, Defence Minister as well as Minister of the Atlantic Canada Opportunities Agency, and  Steven Fletcher, Member of Parliament for Charleswood–St. James–Assiniboia and Parliamentary Secretary for Health, flew to Iqaluit, Nunavut, to officially launch the exercise on 19 August 2008 and observe the process.

2009
Operation Nanook 2009 was the 2009 joint exercise of Maritime Command and the Canadian Coast Guard to train for disaster and sovereignty patrols in the Arctic.
Similar exercises were held in 2007, 2008, 2010 and 2011.

The operation ran from 6 to 28 August 2009. In addition to CCGS Pierre Radisson the operations had the participation of elements of the Canadian Rangers, Primary Reserve soldiers from across Canada, a force of reservists composed of local residents of Nunavut, the frigate HMCS Toronto and the submarine HMCS Corner Brook, and Canadian Forces aircraft.

General Walter J. Natynczyk, Chief of Canada's Defence Staff attended the exercise. On 23 August 2009, Natynczyk met in Iqaluit with Admiral Tim Sloth Jørgensen, Chief of Denmark's Defence staff.

2010

Operation Nanook 2010 was the 2010 annual joint exercise of Maritime Command and the Canadian Coast Guard to train for disaster and sovereignty patrols in the Arctic. Similar exercises were held in 2007, 2008 and 2009. The operation ran from 6 to 26 August 2010. Members of the Canadian Forces Primary Reserve took part in ground exercises in conjunction with Canadian Rangers. Prime Minister Stephen Harper traveled to the Arctic to observe the exercise. Unlike previous exercises, foreign services participated.

Participating forces

Vædderen is a frigate-sized , launched in 1996. Knud Rasmussen was commissioned in 2008, the lead ship of a class specifically designed to patrol Baffin Bay.

USS Porter is a United States Navy guided missile destroyer commissioned in 1999. USCGC Alder is a United States Coast Guard buoy tender homeported in Duluth, Minnesota, on the Great Lakes.

Montréal is a Halifax-class frigate, commissioned in 1993. Goose Bay and Glace Bay are Kingston-class coastal defence vessels, commissioned in 1996 and 1998. Henry Larsen was the only icebreaker among the vessels.

Commentary

The Russian newspaper Pravda described the exercise as "saber rattling".

2011

Operation Nanook 2011 was a military training exercise held in Canada's Arctic in August 2011. It was the fifth such annual exercise. Vessels from the United States Navy, United States Coast Guard and the Royal Danish Navy participated in the exercise.

Two scenarios in the exercise had military and civilian personnel simulate reacting to air and maritime emergencies. While the exercise was being conducted, a commercial airplane (First Air Flight 6560) crashed while approaching Resolute Bay Airport, a short distance away from where the exercise was being held. The military personnel involved in the exercise assisted in rescue and recovery operations.

2012 

Operation Nanook 2012 was a military training exercise held in Canada's Arctic in August 2012. It was the sixth annual exercise. Vessels from the United States Navy, United States Coast Guard and the Royal Danish Navy participated in the exercise.

One scenario simulated intercepting a "vessel of interest" in Baffin Bay. Another scenario had Canadian Armed Forces simulate being dispatched to a northern community, Tsiigehtchic, to assist the Royal Canadian Mounted Police with a "security event".

2014 
Operation Nanook 2014 was the eighth annual Arctic joint training exercise run by the Canadian Armed Forces and the Canadian Coast Guard.

Royal Danish Navy and the United States Navy vessels participated. The Canadian Rangers also participated. Overall approximately 1,000 people took part in the exercise, including local officials.

The training involved several scenarios, including sending boarding parties to an uncooperative vessel, and the simulation of rescuing the complement of a grounded cruise ship.

2016
Operation Nanook 2016 was the tenth annual Arctic joint training exercise run by the Canadian Armed Forces and the Canadian Coast Guard.

Most previous iterations of Operation Nanook took place mainly in the Canadian Arctic Archipelago, while this one's events were set farther west, around Rankin Inlet, Nunavut, and Whitehorse, Yukon.

 visited Churchill, Manitoba, North America's only deepwater port on the Arctic Ocean connected to the North American railway grid.

Mieke Coppes noted that Prime Minister Justin Trudeau was on an official visit overseas during the 2016 Operation Nanook, while previous Prime Minister Stephen Harper had attended all previous operations. Coppes pointed out that the cruise ship Crystal Serenity was transitting the Northwest Passage with a thousand tourists, asserting this sign of global warming should put a greater priority on the exercises.

2017
Operation Nanook 2017 took place from 12 to 27 August 2017. The training exercise took place in parts of Labrador and Nunavut and incorporated more than 720 military and civilian personnel. The Nunavut exercise focused on sealift disaster preparation and simulated the destruction of a barge carrying supplies to the Rankin Inlet community. Canadian Rangers and military personnel from 38 Canadian Brigade Group based in Winnipeg, Manitoba, participated in the Nunavut operation, along with civilians from several government departments. The Labrador operation, based out of Goose Bay, Labrador, focused on northern defence and security. It was the first time Labrador hosted Operation Nanook. The beginning of the Labrador operation was delayed a couple of days due to inclement weather and a damaged helicopter.

The Royal Canadian Navy deployed the Halifax-class frigate Montréal and the Kingston-class coastal defence vessels  and Goose Bay. The Royal Canadian Air Force dedicated three CC-138 Twin Otter aircraft, three CH-146 Griffon helicopters and two CH-147 Chinook helicopters, as well as a CC-130 Hercules and CC-177 Globemaster cargo aircraft to the entire operation.

2018
Operation Nanook 2018 took place from 12 August to 4 September 2018.

2020
Operation Nanook 2020 took place from July to August 2020. It was scaled down due to the COVID-19 pandemic, and resulted in a ban on port visits. The emphasis of that year's exercise was naval readiness, focusing on ship tracking and naval gunnery.

2021

Due to the ongoing COVID-19 pandemic, major changes were made to Operation Nanook for 2021. The training was split into two groups, with ground operations moved from the High Arctic/Nunavut to near Yellowknife, Northwest Territories in March and a second phase to take place in the late spring/early summer months. The operation required that all participants self-isolate in various regions including Nova Scotia, Newfoundland and Labrador, and Yellowknife, and no international participation was allowed. Land forces were transported to their training sites by CH-147F Chinook helicopters.

2022

Ships from the United States, French and Danish navies also took part. Lasting two months, the operation included scientific trials and patrols of the Northwest Passage.

References

External links

Military in the Arctic
Nanook